The Rivière Falaise is a river of Martinique. It flows into the Rivière Capot near L'Ajoupa-Bouillon.

See also
List of rivers of Martinique

References

Rivers of Martinique
Rivers of France